Events in the year 1956 in  Israel.

Incumbents
 Prime Minister of Israel – David Ben-Gurion (Mapai)
 President of Israel – Yitzhak Ben-Zvi
 President of the Supreme Court – Yitzhak Olshan
 Chief of General Staff – Moshe Dayan
 Government of Israel – 7th Government of Israel

Events

 2 February – The IDF prevents the Egyptian delegation from attending the Egypt-Israel Mixed Armistice Commission meeting at al-Auja, in the de-militarized zone.
 29 March – After 15 months in the Syrian captivity, four IDF soldiers of the Golani Brigade return to Israel in exchange for 41 Syrian prisoners. A fifth IDF soldier, Uri Ilan, had committed suicide in captivity. Uri Ilan's remains are later returned to Israel.
 5 April – IDF launch an intensive 120mm mortar attack on Gaza town centre killing 58 civilians. 33 men, 15 women and 10 children.
 1 May – Finance Minister, Levi Eshkol, approves the establishment of the city of Ashdod.
 8 May – Israel and Austria establish diplomatic relations.
 6 June – Tel Aviv University is founded.
 26 July – President Gamal Abdel Nasser of Egypt announces the nationalization of the Suez Canal and Egyptian forces seize control of the canal, moves that precipitate the Suez Crisis and the Sinai Campaign.
 13 September – Operation Gulliver: IDF operation in Jordan in which a small paratroop force stormed the fort at Gharandal, on the TransJordan-Negev border, killing at least 9 policemen and members of the Jordanian camel corps. One IDF member was killed and 12 wounded.
 10 October – Operation Samaria (מבצע שומרון): Following the constant infiltrations from the Jordanian-controlled West Bank, and following the series of attacks by the Jordanian army on Israeli soldiers and civilians, IDF forces raid the Qalqilya police forces. 100 Jordanian soldiers and 17 IDF soldiers are killed during the operation.
 22 October – Israel, Britain and France secretly meet in Sèvres, France, and make plans to invade Egypt.
 29 October – Kafr Qasim massacre: Israeli Border Police shoot and kill 48 Arab civilians for unknowingly disobeying curfew orders imposed by the Israeli army in Kafr Qasim.

Suez Crisis:
 29 October – Israel invades the Sinai Peninsula and push Egyptian forces back toward the Suez Canal.
 2 November – the Gaza strip was occupied by Israel.
 3 November – UN observers report 275 killed in Khan Yunis.
 4 November – Israel captured the Straits of Tiran.
 5 November – Sharm el-Sheikh was occupied by Israel and as a result the Gulf of Aqaba was reopened.
 7 November – The United Nations General Assembly adopted a resolution calling for the United Kingdom, France and Israel to immediately withdraw their troops from Egypt.

Israeli–Palestinian conflict 
The most prominent events related to the Israeli–Palestinian conflict which occurred during 1956 include:

Notable Palestinian militant operations against Israeli targets

The most prominent Palestinian fedayeen terror attacks committed against Israelis during 1956 include:

 7 April – Armed Palestinian Arab militants, who infiltrated into Israel, throw three hand grenades into a house in Ashkelon, killing an Israeli woman.
 11 April – Shafir shooting attack: Armed Palestinian Arab militants, who infiltrated into Israel, entered a synagogue in the village Shafir and open fire at 46 children aged 9–16. Three children and an instructor were killed in the incident. Five children were injured, three of them in serious condition.
 16 August – Eilat bus ambush: an Israeli civilian bus was ambushed by a Fedayeen squad. Four passengers were killed and three were injured during the attack.
 12 September – Ein Ofarim killings: a Palestinian Fedayeen squad infiltrated into Israel and stabbed to death three Druze guardsmen in the Ein Ofarim facility near the village Hatzeva.
 23 September – Ramat Rachel shooting attack Armed Palestinian Arab militants opened fire from a Jordanian position, and killed four archaeologists, and wounded sixteen others, near kibbutz Ramat Rachel.
 4 October – Negev desert road ambush: A squad of 10 armed Palestinian Arab militants, who infiltrated into Israel from Jordan, ambush and kill five Israeli construction workers in Sdom.
 9 October  – Armed Palestinian Arab militants, who infiltrated into Israel from Jordan, kill two Israeli workers in an orchard near the Israeli youth village Neve Hadassah and cut off their ears.
 8 November – Armed Palestinian Arab militants opened fire on a train, attacked cars and blew up wells, in the North and Center of Israel. Six Israelis were wounded.

Notable Israeli military operations against Palestinian militancy targets

The most prominent Israeli military counter-terrorism operations (military campaigns and military operations) carried out against Palestinian militants during 1956 include:

  11/12 September – Operation Jonathon (מבצע יהונתן): Following an attack carried out by the Arab Legion troops on IDF soldiers training in Beit Govrin in which attack killed eight academic reserve medical students were killed, The next day Israeli IDF forces were sent to carry out a reprisal raid in the Khirbet al Rahwa police fort, on the Hebron-Beersheba road (then under the control of Jordan). Over twenty Jordanian soldiers and policemen were killed in the raid.
 25 September – Operation Lulav (מבצע לולב): Following the murder of the participants in an archaeological conference held in Ramat Rachel and the murder of two farmers from Moshav Aminadav and Kibbutz Maoz Haim, IDF forces raid the police fort at Husan, near Bethlehem, in the West Bank (then under the control of Jordan). Thirty-seven Legionnaires and National Guardsmen were killed as well as two civilians. Nine IDF members were also killed.

Unknown dates
 The founding of the city Ashdod.
 The founding of the moshav Even Shmuel.
 The founding of the Local council Mitzpe Ramon.
 The founding of the town Netivot.

Notable births
 16 February – Rina Mor, the first Israeli Miss Universe winner.
 8 June – Oded Machnes, former Israeli footballer.
 29 December – Yehudit Ravitz, Israeli singer and composer.

Notable deaths
 12 February – Ezriel Carlebach (born 1909), German-born Israeli journalist and publicist, founder and editor of the Israeli daily tabloid "Ma'ariv".
 25 February – Jacob Levitzki (born 1904), Russian (Ukraine)-born Israeli mathematician.
 10 December – David Shimoni (born 1891), Russian-born Israeli poet and writer.

Major public holidays

See also
 1956 in Israeli film
 1956 in Israeli music
 1956 in Israeli sport
 Israel at the 1956 Summer Olympics

References

External links